Khaled Kaim was the Deputy Foreign Minister of Libya. On 5 September 2011, it was reported that he has been arrested in Tripoli during the Libyan Civil War. As of 2022, Kaim had been reported to be living in Uganda.

References

Living people
Foreign ministers of Libya
Year of birth missing (living people)